Artland Arena is an indoor sporting arena that is located in Quakenbrück, Germany.  The seating capacity of the arena for basketball games is 3,000 people, of which 2,812 seats are permanent, and 200 seats are temporary.  It is currently home to the German League professional basketball team Artland Dragons.

References

External links
Artland Arena at artland.de 
Artland Arena at artland-dragons.de 

Basketball venues in Germany
Buildings and structures in Osnabrück (district)
Indoor arenas in Germany
Sports venues in Lower Saxony